The following is a list of brands of mountaineering equipment, sorted by continent and country.

Europe

Denmark
ECCO
Hummel

Finland
Karhu
Nokian Footwear
Polar
Suunto (Ultimately owned by ANTA Sports, China) (Finland-based, Chinese-owned)
Amer Sports Corporation (Finland-based, Chinese-owned)

France
Aigle
Eider
Lafuma
Millet
Petzl
Quechua
Rossignol
Salomon (Ultimately owned by ANTA Sports, China) (France-based, Chinese-owned)

Germany
Adidas
Hanwag
Deuter
Jack Wolfskin (German-based, American-owned)
Meindl
Puma (German-based, French-owned)
Vaude

Italy
CAMP
Grivel
La Sportiva
Vibram
Ferrino
Scarpa

Norway
Ajungilak (Mammut)
Bergans of Norway
Dale of Norway
Helly Hansen
Norrøna

Slovenia
Alpina Žiri

Spain
Tenaya (Catalonia)

Sweden
Fjällräven (Fenix Outdoor AB)
Haglöfs (ASICS, Japan) (Sweden-based, Japanese-owned)
Hestra
Hilleberg
Primus
Silva
Tenson
Trangia (Trangia AB)

Switzerland
Mammut
Victorinox

UK
Alpkit
Berghaus (Pentland Group)
Craghoppers
Dunlop Sport
Karrimor
Lowe Alpine (Rab)
Mountain Equipment
Montane
Mountain Warehouse
Nikwax Analogy
Paramo
Peter Storm
Rab
Regatta
Terra Nova Equipment (Derbyshire, UK)
Trespass
Wild Country
Vango (AMG Group)

North America

Canada
Mountain Equipment Company, formerly Mountain Equipment Co-op
Arc'teryx (Ultimately owned by ANTA Sports, China) (Canada-based, Chinese-owned)

United States
 Black Diamond
 CamelBak
 Cascade Designs
 MSR (Mountain Safety Research)
 Therm-a-Rest
 Champion
 Coleman
 Columbia Sportswear
 Columbia Montrail
 Mountain Hardwear
 prAna
 Danner
 Eddie Bauer
 Five Ten Footwear (US-based, German-owned)
 Gerry
 Golite
 Granite Gear
 Head (American-owned)
 Ibex
 Johnson Outdoors
 Keen
 Kelty
 L.L.Bean
 Leatherman
 Lowe Alpine (Asolo)
 Marmot (Jarden)
 Merrell
 NEMO Equipment
 New Balance
 Nike
 Osprey
 Outdoor Research
 Patagonia
 Penfield
 REI (Recreational Equipment Inc.)
 VF Corporation
 Jansport
 Eastpak
 The North Face
 Timberland

Oceania

Australia
Anaconda
Boating Camping and Fishing
Rebel

New Zealand
Icebreaker
Kathmandu
Macpac

Asia

Nepal
Kalapatthar
Dolpo
Sherpa (fabric)

See also
Mountaineering
List of outdoor industry parent companies

References

Brands
 
mountaineering equipment brands